The Grand Duchy of Luxembourg has submitted films for the Academy Award for Best International Feature Film since 1997. The Foreign Language Film award is handed out annually by the United States Academy of Motion Picture Arts and Sciences to a feature-length motion picture produced outside the United States that contains primarily non-English dialogue. , eighteen Luxembourgian films have been submitted for the Academy Award for Best Foreign Language Film, but none have yet been nominated for an Academy Award.

Submissions
The Academy of Motion Picture Arts and Sciences has invited the film industries of various countries to submit their best film for the Academy Award for Best Foreign Language Film since 1956. The Foreign Language Film Award Committee oversees the process and reviews all the submitted films. Following this, they vote via secret ballot to determine the five nominees for the award. Below is a list of the films that have been submitted by Luxembourg for review by the Academy for the award by year and the respective Academy Awards ceremony.

Because of Luxembourg's small size, many of the submitted films were co-productions with neighboring countries. AMPAS disqualified Your Name is Justine in 2006, arguing that Luxembourg did not have sufficient artistic control over the muilti-national film, which was directed by a Poland-based Venezuelan director, set in Germany and Poland, funded primarily by Luxembourg, and shot mostly in Polish and English. The film was originally considered to represent Poland, but it did not make Poland's four-film shortlist  and it was subsequently selected to represent Luxembourg.

Luxembourg's first submission, Elles also straddled the nationality guidelines. Directed by a Portuguese and set in Lisbon, the film was primarily in French, and featured a diverse lead cast from France, Portugal, Spain, Switzerland, and the US, but not Luxembourg. Dead Man's Hand was a minority Luxembourg production, which actually represented Belgium at several film festivals. All other films were directed by native-born Luxembourgian directors.

Of Luxembourg's nine accepted submissions, two were light comedies (1998 and 2002), two were contemporary dramas (1997 and 2003) one was an animated film (2005), one was a thriller (2008,) one was a crime drama (2013,) and two were period dramas set in the 1940s (2009) and 1960s (2007).

See also
List of Academy Award winners and nominees for Best Foreign Language Film
List of Academy Award-winning foreign language films
Cinema of Luxembourg

Notes

References

External links
The Official Academy Awards Database
The Motion Picture Credits Database
IMDb Academy Awards Page

Luxembourg
Academy Award